MPIO or Mpio (Hangul: 엠피오) was a South Korean consumer electronics brand and company. Established in 1998 by Woo Jung-Ku, it was one of Korea's early manufacturers of MP3 players and was known for producing portable digital audio players, media players and CD players capable of decoding MP3 data files on CDs. Previously, the company was known as DigitalWay Co., Ltd.

History
The company, originally as DigitalWay, was created as an OEM developer for large corporations - its first client was Samsung and the first product from their contract, a Samsung-branded MP3 player, debuted at the 1999 Consumer Electronics Show. In 2000, the company launched its own brand, Mpio, which eventually would become the name of the company. By 2002 it held 20% of the worldwide DAP market, including 15% in Europe and North America and 30% in Japan. The vast majority of its sales came from its own Mpio brand rather than through contracts of other firms. Mpio was noticeably better known outside of South Korea itself.

In Japan, Mpio players were sold by Adtec Co., Ltd., a fully owned subsidiary of DigitalWay. In 2005, Mpio Japan Co., Ltd. was formed as a successor business.

In September 2004 DigitalWay merged with a company called Yes Com Co., Ltd. and registered on the KOSDAQ exchange. MPIO became the name of the new company.

Mpio's first jukebox player was the HD-100 in 2004 with a 20 GB hard disk, aiming to capture sales away from the iPod and iriver H300 series. Half of its sales that year were from North America. However, its situation in the market deteriorated in 2005. Unlike iriver which could depend on domestic sales for survival, 90% of Mpio's revenue came from outside South Korea. The company posted a net loss of 21 billion won ($21.7 million) in 2005. In April 2006, founder and CEO Woo Jung-ku sold 8% out of 15% of his personal shares in the company to SW Net, a company specialising in jewellery. Then, Jung-Ku now as an employee, was dismissed from the company and was replaced by SW NET's president Kang Shin-woo.

On November 10, 2006, Shin-woo and other members of the company's board of directors were accused in Korean media of embezzlement, as much as 9.8 billion won. This was followed by resignations and the bankruptcy of one of its subsidiaries. Chung Myung-an held a temporary CEO position until it was filled by Kim Jeong-ho. The company announced its entry in the biodiesel business and entered the development of ozone-free halogen light bulb development. In August 2007, MPIO announced that CEO Jeong-ho embezzled 9 million won, 134% of MPIO's equity capital.

In 2008 the company had renamed itself Innoblue Co., no longer in the MP3 business, and it is now involved mainly in pollution reduction equipment.

Products

Product list of MPIO:

MP3 players

2000
MP10, Mpio's first player originally as OEM then under its own brand, rectangular shaped
DMU10, rectangular shaped
DMV10, rectangular shaped
EX-MP, square shaped
DMY10, square shaped
DMJ10, square shaped

2001
DMG, square shaped playe, 32/64/128 MB memory, with a SmartMedia slot plus built-in microphone for recording and WMA playback support. Also sold as the Odyssey 200 and 300 by licensee e.Digital.
DMB, rectangle shaped player, 32/64/128 MB memory, with a SmartMedia slot for extra 128 MB expansion

2002
DMG Plus, update of DMG
DMB Plus, update of DMB with additional FM radio recording and a line-in
DME, smaller variant of DMG/DMB. Also sold as the Odyssey 100 by licensee e.Digital.
DMK, small keychain style player, 64/128 MB

2003
FD100, square shaped player that was popular
FL100, rectangular player that was popular
FY100, "sporty" player
HD100, Mpio's first jukebox and hard drive player, 20 GB memory

2004
FY200, white coloured player that continued the DMK's design, a successful model.
FY300, primitive designed with USB stick. Also sold under the name Stormblue Xuke MP-500.
FL200, medallion style. Also sold under the name Beadsounds EMP-Z.
FG100
FL300, update of FL200, medallion style
FY400, update of FY300.
HD300, jukebox, 20/40 GB memory.
HD200, microdrive player, 5 GB.

2005
FG200 (One), high-end flash player with colour display
FY600, small budget-oriented player
FY500/FY500SE, small budget-oriented player
FL350, medallion update of FL300
PD100, player that can also pick up DAB radio and record from it alongside FM
i-Bulldog, budget sub-brand

2006
HD400 (SOLID), microdrive player, 8 GB.
FL400 (QUARTZ), medallion player
FY700, budget player
FY800, 1/2/4 GB flash player with SD card slot for expansion
FL500, medallion style player

2007
MG100, 9.2 mm thick player
ML100, renamed from FY900
ML300
MG300, 2/4/8 GB PMP

2008
FY1000, 2/4/8 GB PMP
FY500SE
PD100

MP3 CD players
CMG
CL100
CL200

Others
Playit X3 (HRP250 / HRP160), Home Media Player
HS100 / HS200, USB storage devices
DC100, digital camera (for use with DMG and DMB music players)

References

External links
M-Pio Homepage
M-Pio USA Homepage (Digital Way Inc.)
M-Pio Europe Homepage (M-Pio Peros GmbH)
M-Pio China Homepage (Digital Way Shanghai Co, Ltd)

Portable media players
Portable audio player manufacturers
Audio equipment manufacturers of South Korea
South Korean brands
Consumer electronics brands
Manufacturing companies established in 1998